Milan Ristić (born 8 August 1991) is a Serbian track and field athlete who specializes in hurdling. Having competed in hurdling and other events with archrivals AK Crvena Zvezda and AK Partizan, he has represented Serbia in international competition. Ristić has competed in track at both high school and collegiate levels in the United States. He is a Serbian national record holder in the indoor 60 meter hurdles and the outdoor 110 meter hurdles events. Ristić is a member of Serbian national senior team since 2010.

Track career

Youth
Ristić attended an electrotechnical school in Belgrade called "Nikola Tesla". He began training athletics with AK 21. Maj, then he transferred to AK Crvena Zvezda, where he was a national champion of Serbia in the 100 meters, 200 meters and with the relay 4x100 meters for U20 years of age disciplines. He would eventually change teams to his currently third team to AK Partizan in the transfer period of 2013/2014.

Collegiate and international
Ristić was recruited by University of North Carolina at Asheville, where he broke the school's records in the 200 meters indoor, 60 meter hurdles, and 55 meter hurdles, 60 meters indoors, 55 meters indoors, Long Jump outdoors, 110 meters hurdles, 100 meters and 200 meters. He is undefeated in 110 meters hurdles in Serbia since 2010. He is a senior National champion in the 110 meters hurdles 3 times currently. Eventually he was transferred to University of California, Berkeley, where he competed indoor and currently still runs outdoor. He ran personal best after the transfer dropping his hurdles times for indoors from 7.75s from UNC Asheville to 7.67s wearing UC Berkeley's jersey, he also dropped his outdoor time from 13.88s to 13.59s. He represent Serbia at the 2013 Mediterranean Games in the 110 meter hurdles. In 2014, Ristić placed sixth overall at the 2014 NCAA DI Indoor T&F Championships in the indoor 60 meter hurdles, breaking a Serbian national record in the process two times in two days. He broke the National record 3 times in 2 weeks over the indoor season (2013/2014)

International competitions

References

External links
 
 
 
 
  (archive)

1991 births
Living people
Serbian male hurdlers
Serbian male sprinters
Athletes from Belgrade
World Athletics Championships athletes for Serbia
Athletes (track and field) at the 2016 Summer Olympics
Olympic athletes of Serbia
Athletes (track and field) at the 2013 Mediterranean Games
Mediterranean Games competitors for Serbia
21st-century Serbian people